The Stockton Jail, in Stockton, Utah, is an historic jail that was built in 1902, after Stockton was incorporated in 1901.  The jail was listed on the National Register of Historic Places (NRHP) in 1985.

The building is merely  large, divided into three compartments.  It is made with concrete walls and roof and has a "false front" parapet.  At the time of its NRHP listing it was well preserved.  A 2010 photo shows it has been protected by a chain link fence.  It is historically significant as the only surviving building associated with early enforcement of the law in Stockton, and it is believed to be the best preserved local public building from its era.

It is one of just 23 NRHP-listed properties in Tooele County, Utah, a 7,287 square-mile large county which thus has more than 300 square miles per NRHP listing.  To become NRHP-listed, a property must be nominated and receive local, state, and national level approvals for its historic significance.

See also 

Juab County Jail, NRHP-listed in Juab County, Utah

References

Further reading
 Capace, Nancy (2001). The Encyclopedia of Utah. North American Book Dist LLC. p. 337. 

Jails on the National Register of Historic Places in Utah
Government buildings completed in 1902
Buildings and structures in Tooele County, Utah
Jails in Utah
National Register of Historic Places in Tooele County, Utah